Biblen is a stage play from Denmark, performed at Nørrebros Theater during early 2008 (23 February to 26 April). It takes the form of a skrako play, a Danish kind of play which blends acting, rapping, and stand-up comedy.

The play is based on the Bible, deriving its plot from a number of Biblical stories, such as Cain and Abel, Noah's Ark, Moses and the Ten Commandments, the Workers in the Vineyard, the Last Supper, and the crucifixion of Jesus. It also serves as a satire of the Bible, the Church of Denmark, and the Danish relationship with religion more broadly.

See also
 Life of Jesus in the New Testament
 Cultural Christian
 Christianity in Denmark
 Religion in Denmark

Sources 
 Website of the show (from archive.org) (in Danish)
 Review in Jyllands-Posten (in Danish)

21st-century Danish plays
2008 plays
Plays based on the Bible